Larry Detwiler is a television director, miniature effects artist, and visual effects producer. After early experience in miniature effects, he took on a supervisory role in later films including Jane Austen's Mafia!, later progressing to the title of visual effects supervisor. He has served in this capacity on the television program CSI: Crime Scene Investigation as well as its spin-off series, CSI: Miami, where he has directed several episodes.

Career
Detwiler worked in miniature effects, on the 1994 television film Island City. He served as miniature effects supervisor on the 1998 film, Jane Austen's Mafia!. For the 2001 film Tomcats, Detwiler was employed as the visual effects supervisor for its production. Later production roles included work on films Control Factor and Trapped.

Detwiler worked as visual effects supervisor for the television program CSI: Crime Scene Investigation. He subsequently transitioned to the same role at CSI: Miami. In an interview with Daily Variety, Detwiler commented on the working environment with the rest of the production team on the show: "What makes us unique is that our visual effects department has gone in-house. On this show we're right down the hall from the director and the writers and can talk to them instantly about anything that's going on. It makes things a lot more collaborative and easier in terms of getting the look that's wanted for the effects." Detwiler utilized latex modeling, computer graphics, and green screen work to manipulate visual effects shots for CSI.

Filmography

Television

Film

Awards and nominations

See also

List of film and television directors
Video art
Visual effects
Special effects

References

Further reading

External links

Year of birth missing (living people)
Living people
American television directors
Special effects people